Olympia is an unincorporated community in Cedar County, in the U.S. state of Missouri. The community is on Missouri Route 97 at the intersection with county routes E and CC approximately nine miles south of El Dorado Springs. Horse Creek flows past about one mile to the east.

History
A post office called Olympia was established in 1899, and closed in 1907. An earlier variant name of the community was Hyattsville, after Mr. Hyatt, a local merchant.

References

Unincorporated communities in Cedar County, Missouri
Unincorporated communities in Missouri